Laura Fazliu (born 28 September 2000) is a Kosovan judoka. She won the silver medal in the women's 63 kg event at the 2022 European Judo Championships held in Sofia, Bulgaria. She won the gold medal in the women's 63 kg event at the 2022 Mediterranean Games held in Oran, Algeria.

She lost her bronze medal match in the women's 63 kg event at the 2018 Mediterranean Games held in Tarragona, Spain.

In 2021, she lost her bronze medal match in the women's 63 kg event at the European Judo Championships held in Lisbon, Portugal. She also competed in the women's 63 kg event at the 2021 World Judo Championships held in Budapest, Hungary.

References

External links
 
 

Living people
2000 births
Place of birth missing (living people)
Kosovan female judoka
Competitors at the 2018 Mediterranean Games
Competitors at the 2022 Mediterranean Games
Mediterranean Games gold medalists for Kosovo
Mediterranean Games medalists in judo